Leucania obsoleta, the obscure wainscot, is a moth of the superfamily Noctuoidea. The species was first described by Jacob Hübner in 1803. It is found in Europe.

The length of the forewings is 15–18 mm. The moth flies in one generation from early May to late July.

The larvae feed on Phragmites species.

Notes
The flight season refers to Belgium and the Netherlands. This may vary in other parts of the range.

External links

Lepiforum e.V.
De Vlinderstichting 

Leucania
Moths of Europe
Moths of Asia
Taxa named by Jacob Hübner